is a railway station in Ichikai, Tochigi Prefecture, Japan, operated by the Mooka Railway.

Lines
Ichihana Station is a station on the Mooka Line, and is located 34.3 rail kilometers from the terminus of the line at Shimodate Station.

Station layout
Ichihana Station has two opposed side platforms connected to the station building by a level crossing. The station is unattended.

History
Ichihana Station opened on 15 December 1920 as a station on the Japanese Government Railway, which subsequently became the Japanese National Railways (JNR).  The station was absorbed into the JR East network upon the privatization of the JNR on 1 April 1987, and the Mooka Railway from 11 April 1988.

Surrounding area
Ichikai Town Hall
Ichikai Post Office
Ichikai Elementary School
Ichikai Middle School

References

External links

 Mooka Railway Station information  

Railway stations in Tochigi Prefecture
Railway stations in Japan opened in 1920
Ichikai, Tochigi